Alonzo G. Brown was an American football coach.  He served as the head football coach at Allegheny College  in Meadville, Pennsylvania.  He held that position for the 1899 season.  His coaching record at Allegheny was 7–2–2.

References 

Year of birth missing
Year of death missing
Allegheny Gators football coaches